Paul Kevin Masterson is a Northern Irish DJ and record producer, originally from Belfast and now living in London. He is best known for recording as Yomanda. He is also part of the dance music duo Hi-Gate, along with BBC Radio 1 DJ Judge Jules.

Biography
Recording as Amen! UK, he had a hi-NRG hit with "Passion", released by Deconstruction Records in 1995. Billboard magazine described it as being "underlined by an intangible but apparent reverence for hi-NRG architects, such as the late Patrick Cowley", praising the track's "crazy-catchy chorus" while slightly criticizing the lack of "meaty" lyrics otherwise.

As Paul Masterson presents Sushi, he had another hit with "The Earthshaker" in 2002. He has used various recording aliases since 1995, which are listed below. In the United States, his best known production, Candy Girls (which featured an American lead vocalist, Sweet Pussy Pauline), reached number 7 on Billboards Dance Club Songs chart with "Wham Bam" in 1996.

He has also worked with Judge Jules, most notably billed as Hi-Gate.

Production aliases

Amen! UK / Amen!
Candy Girls
Celine Diablo
Clergy
Dorothy
Erotixs
Hi-Gate
Paul Masterson
Sleazesisters / Sleaze Sisters
Subway
Succargo
Sushi
VPL
Wand
Working Class Hero
Yomanda

Discography

Singles
"Synth and Strings" (Yomanda) (1999) – UK No. 8
"Sunshine" (Yomanda) (2000) – UK No. 16
"On the Level" (Yomanda) (2000) – UK No. 28
"You're Free" (Yomanda) (2003) – UK No. 22
"Got the Chance" (Yomanda vs Uto)
"Kaminari" (Yomanda vs Uto)
"Passion" (Amen! UK) (1997) – UK No. 15
"People of Love" (Amen! UK) (1997) – UK No. 36
"Passion" (Amen! UK) (2003) – UK No. 40
"The Earthshaker" (Paul Masterson presents Sushi) (2002) – UK No. 35
"Stars" (Paul Masterson)
"What U Got, What You Do" (Paul Masterson presents Subway)
"Pullin For 2" (Paul Masterson presents Subway)
"Pitchin' (In Every Direction)" (Hi-Gate) (2000) – UK No. 6
"I Can Hear Voices" / "Caned and Unable" (Hi-Gate) (2000) – UK No. 12
"Gonna Work It Out" (Hi-Gate) (2001) – UK No. 25
"Mayhem in Miami" (Paul Masterson and BK)
"Saints & Sinners" (Clergy)
"The Oboe Song" (Clergy) (2002) – UK No. 50
"The Bassline" (VPL)
"T-Break" (VPL)
"Sex" (Sleazesisters with Vikki Shepard) (1995) – UK No. 53
Let's Whip It Up (You Go Girl)" (Sleazesisters with Vikki Shepard) (1996) – UK No. 46
"Work It Up" (Sleaze Sisters) (1998) – UK No. 74
"Fe Fi Fo Fum" (Candy Girls featuring Sweet Pussy Pauline) (1995) – UK No. 23
"Wham Bam" (Candy Girls featuring Sweet Pussy Pauline) (1996) – UK No. 20
"I Want Candy" (Candy Girls featuring Valerie Malcolm) – UK No. 30
"What's That Tune (Doo Doo Doo Doo Doo-Doo-Doo-Doo-Doo-Doo) (Dorothy) (1995) – UK No. 31
"Good To Love You" (PM Project with Sharon Woolf) (limited white label)
"The Sound" (Yomtrax)

Co production
"Hi-Gate" (with Judge Jules) (albums)      
2003 Split Personality
"VPL" (with Judge Jules) (singles)
2001 "The Bassline"
2002 "T Break"
2003 "Bass Trouble"
2003 "In The Park"
2003 "It's Showtime"

References

External links
Discogs.com – Discography

Year of birth missing (living people)
Living people
DJs from Belfast
Club DJs
Record producers from Northern Ireland
House musicians from Northern Ireland
Remixers
Electronic dance music DJs